Berdik is a village in the Artashat Municipality of the Ararat Province of Armenia.

References 
 (as Bzovan)

Populated places in Ararat Province
Yazidi populated places in Armenia